Ventura-San Gabriel coastal basin (HUC 180701) is one of three hydrologic basins within the Southern California Coastal water resource subregion and is one of approximately 2,200 water resource basins in the United States hydrologic unit system.

The Ventura-San Gabriel coastal basin is a third-level subdivision of the United States hydrologic unit system. The tiers of the classification system, in order from largest to smallest, are regions, subregions, basins (formerly accounting units), subbasins (formerly cataloging units), watersheds, and subwatersheds. These geographic areas contain either the drainage area of a major river, or the combined drainage areas of a group of rivers. 

The Ventura-San Gabriel coastal basins is composed of seven fourth-level hydrological units called water resource subbasins (formerly known as water resource accounting units), each with its own 8-digit hydrologic unit code.

List of subbasins of the Ventura-San Gabriel coastal basin

See also
 Groundwater recharge
 Water in California
 Principal aquifers of California

References

Lists of drainage basins
Water resource basins
Geography of California
Los Angeles County, California
Ventura County, California
Orange County, California
Environment of Greater Los Angeles